Alexandre Perreault (born 15 December 1998) is a Canadian swimmer. He competed in the men's 50 metre butterfly event at the 2018 FINA World Swimming Championships (25 m), in Hangzhou, China.

References

External links
 

1998 births
Living people
Canadian male butterfly swimmers
Place of birth missing (living people)
Competitors at the 2019 Summer Universiade